= December 2021 Cameroon clashes =

- Date: 2021
- Location: Cameroon
- Caused by: Community herders and fisherman

Casualties
- Death: Dozens

In early December 2021, ethnic clashes in Northern Cameroon occurred that left several people dead. the clashes which started between the community herders and fisherman. Estimates range from a few dozen, from at least 19 to over 22.

These are related to clashes that occurred earlier in the year.
